Pastel is an extended version of the Pascal programming language, created in c. 1982 for Amber, an operating system for the S-1 supercomputer project at Lawrence Livermore National Laboratory in California.  The Pastel compiler was the inspiration for Richard Stallman's GNU C compiler.

Pastel was conceived by Jeffrey M. Broughton, then Project Engineer in charge of compilers and operating system software for the S-1 project, because of dissatisfaction with the PL/1 language in which Amber was being implemented. The language was named Pastel ("an off-color Pascal").

Compared with Pascal compilers of that period, Pastel's features included:
Improved type definition 
Parametric types 
Explicit packing and allocation control 
Additional parameter passing modes 
Additional control constructs 
Set iteration 
Loop-exit form 
Return statement 
Module definition 
Exception handling 
General enhancements 
Conditional boolean operations 
Constant expressions 
Variable initialization

References

1982 software
Pascal (programming language) compilers